Alice Moran  is a British-Canadian actress and writer currently residing Toronto, Ontario. She stars on the CBC Television Crawford.

Career
Moran grew up in St. Albert and later Red Deer, Alberta. When her family moved back to Ontario, she first began performing improv when she competed in the Canadian Improv Games. At the age of 18 she began working for The Second City as member of their educational company and later national touring company. With Second City, she created several videos for their YouTube channel, including "Hogwarts: Which House are you?".

On March 13, 2016 she won a Canadian Screen Award with the cast of Sunnyside in the category of Best Performance in a Variety or Sketch Comedy Program or Series.

Personal life 
Moran is a lifelong supporter of the Edmonton Oilers and the Toronto Blue Jays.

Filmography

Television

References

External links

 

Living people
Actresses from Ontario
Canadian film actresses
Canadian sketch comedians
Canadian television actresses
Comedians from Ontario
People from Ajax, Ontario
Year of birth missing (living people)
Canadian Comedy Award winners
Canadian Screen Award winners